The 1931 French Grand Prix (formally the XXV Grand Prix de l'A.C.F.) was a Grand Prix motor race held at Autodrome de Linas-Montlhéry on 21 June 1931. As with the other two races in the 1931 AIACR European Championship, this race was held over 10 hours, not over a fixed distance. As a result, most cars had two drivers.

The race was won by Louis Chiron and Achille Varzi driving a factory entered Bugatti T51, who after early race battles lead more than eight hours of the race

Classification

Notes

References

French Grand Prix
French Grand Prix
1931 in French motorsport